Otago Regiment may refer to:

 Otago Mounted Rifles Regiment (1911–1921)
 Otago Infantry Regiment (NZEF) (1914-1919)
 Otago Regiment (1921-1948) training and recruitment regiment 
 Otago and Southland Regiment  (1948-1964)
 4th Otago and Southland Battalion Group (1964-2012)

History of Otago